The 1914 West Wicklow by-election was held on 20 August 1914.  The by-election was held due to the death of the incumbent Irish Parliamentary MP, Edward Peter O'Kelly.  It was won by the Irish Parliamentary candidate John Thomas Donovan who was unopposed due to a War-time electoral pact.

References

1914 elections in Ireland
1914 elections in the United Kingdom
By-elections to the Parliament of the United Kingdom in County Wicklow constituencies
Unopposed by-elections to the Parliament of the United Kingdom (need citation)